The Swing Bridge in Keeseville, New York over the Ausable River is not a swing bridge.  It is a pedestrian suspension bridge that happens to swing, disconcertingly.  It was designed and manufactured by the Berlin Iron Bridge Company in 1888 and it crosses from Clinton County, New York to Essex County, New York.

It was listed on the National Register of Historic Places in 1999.

References

Bridges on the National Register of Historic Places in New York (state)
Bridges completed in 1888
Bridges in Clinton County, New York
Bridges in Essex County, New York
Pedestrian bridges in New York (state)
National Register of Historic Places in Clinton County, New York
National Register of Historic Places in Essex County, New York
Pedestrian bridges on the National Register of Historic Places
Suspension bridges in New York (state)